Patricia Kilpatrick (born February 12, 1969) is an American politician who served in the Kansas House of Representatives as a Republican from the 29th district from 2005 to 2006. Kilpatrick won the 2004 Republican primary election by a six-point margin, and then had a more comfortable victory in the general election, winning with 66% of the vote.
 In 2006, she declined to run for re-election and was succeeded by fellow Republican Sheryl Spalding.

References

Republican Party members of the Kansas House of Representatives
Living people
Women state legislators in Kansas
1969 births
21st-century American women politicians
21st-century American politicians
Politicians from Overland Park, Kansas